Solomon Alexander Amu Djoleto (born 22 July 1929) is a Ghanaian writer and educator.

Life
Amu Djoleto was born at Manyakpogunor, Manya Krobo, Ghana, the son of Frederick Badu, a Presbyterian minister, and Victoria Shome Tetteh, "a modest trader". He was educated at Accra Academy and St. Augustine's College, Cape Coast before reading English at the University of Ghana. He joined Ghana's Ministry of Education in the 1960s as a teacher and education officer. After studying textbook production at the Institute of Education, University of London, he returned to Ghana to edit the Ghana Teachers' Journal. At one point heading the Ministry of Education's publishing programme, he has continued to work for the Ministry of Education.

Djoleto contributed to the poetry anthologies Voices of Ghana (1958) and Messages (1970), and his poems were collected in Amid the Swelling Act. He is best known for his novels, the first of which was The Strange Man (1967).

Works

Novels
 The Strange Man, London, Heinemann, 1967. African Writers Series, no. 41. 
 Money Galore,  London [etc.]: Heinemann, 1975. African Writers Series, no. 160.
 Hurricane of Dust, 1987

Poetry
 Amid the Swelling Act, 1992

Children's books
 Obodai Sai, 1990
 Twins in Trouble, 1991
 The Frightened Thief, 1992
 The Girl who Knows about Cars, 1996
 Kofi Loses his Way, 1996
 Akos and the Fire Ghost, 1998

Other
 English practice for the African student, 1967
 (ed. with T. H. S. Kwami) West African Prose, Heinemann Educational Books, 1972.
 The Ghana Book Development Council: aims and objectives, 1976
 Books and reading in Ghana, 1985

References

1929 births
Living people
Ghanaian novelists
Ghanaian male poets
Ghanaian educators
Alumni of the Accra Academy
20th-century Ghanaian poets
20th-century male writers
St. Augustine's College (Cape Coast) alumni
Ga-Adangbe people